The 1892 North Dakota gubernatorial election was held on November 8, 1892. People's Party nominee Eli C. D. Shortridge defeated incumbent Republican Andrew H. Burke with 52.43% of the vote.

General election

Candidates
Eli C. D. Shortridge, People's
Andrew H. Burke, Republican

Results

References

1892
North Dakota
Gubernatorial